Solférino is a station on Line 12 of the Paris Métro in the 7th arrondissement.

The station opened on 5 November 1910 as part of the original section of the Nord-Sud Company's line A between Porte de Versailles and Notre-Dame-de-Lorette. On 27 March 1931 line A became line 12 of the Métro. It is named after the Rue de Solférino, which is named after the Battle of Solferino, a battle fought in 1859 during the Second Italian War of Independence.

Solférino is one of the last stations in which the original Nord-Sud Company style of décor has been maintained, with its characteristic large ceramic tablets indicating the name of the station. This is the result of extensive renovation.

Nearby are the Musée d'Orsay and the town hall of the 7th arrondissement.

Station layout

Gallery

References
Roland, Gérard (2003). Stations de métro. D’Abbesses à Wagram. Éditions Bonneton.

Paris Métro stations in the 7th arrondissement of Paris
Railway stations in France opened in 1910